The Swamp Critters of Lost Lagoon (originally named Swamp Critters) is an American children's television series created by country music star Bobby Goldsboro. Targeted for children aged 2 to 8, the show featured characters brought to life by actors. The program aired on PBS Kids and The Learning Channel from 1996 to 2001, and according to the show's website, it currently airs on the America One Television Network and on TCT Kids.

Characters

Band 
 William Robert "Billy Bob/Will" Possum (lead singer, bass player, tambourine, harmonica) the problem solver of the group.
 Karina Desire "Kari/K.D." Watson (second lead singer, tambourine, soniator guitar/guitar, drums) the cheerful member of the group.
 Rancid DuBois (bass player, keyboard,vocals) {Currently}
 Joseph "Joe" Raccoon (banjo/guitar, harmonica, saxophone, vocals)
 Gumbo the Fiddler Crab (fiddle/violin, vocals)
 Todd Bender (bass player, vocals, cameraman)
 Ribbit E. Lee (drums, vocals)
 Ima Dilla Armadillo (tambourine, dancer, vocals)
 Chase Isben (bass player, keyboard, vocals) {Episode 1 - 27}
 Alouisious "Big Al Gator" Reptilicus (piano, accordion, vocals)

Other 
 T. Bone Willie
 Slim Pig
 Bobby Q. Pig
 Cashew Squirrel
 Melvis Weasley
 Picasso "Speedy" Cottontail as the Easter Bunny and Kari's BFFA
 Lumpkin the Pumpkin
 Stinger
 Patience
 Henrietta Hen
 Stormy Weathers
 Dr. Betterfeel
 Sam and Ethel Watson as Mason's Parents and Kari's Grandparents
 Shecky Dangerfield-Mouse
 Snorkel Elephant
 Frank Possum as Suzy Ann's husband, Joel and D.J.'s father and Billy Bob's brother-in-law
 Mason Watson as Kari's Widowed Father and Sam & Ethel's Son
 Harry Bear
 Mya Raccoon as Joe's younger sister
 Suzy Ann Possum as Billy Bob's older sister, Joel and D.J.'s mother and Frank's wife
 Willie Hank "Country" Weston
 Freada Dyle as Big Al's girlfriend
 Granny Muskrat
 Bonnie and the Bunnies
 Michelle Possum as Billy Bob's girlfriend with a French accent
 Phineas Phatrat
 William Snakespear
 Rosemary Phatrat as Phineas' twin sister and Farley's mother
 Farley Phatrat as Phineas' nephew
 Lil' Rock Raccoon as Joe's nephew and Mya's son
 Joel Possum as Billy Bob's nephew and Frank & Suzy Ann's son
 Dorothy-Jane "D.J." Possum as Billy Bob's niece and Frank and Suzy Ann's daughter
 Lil' Pedro as Big Al's next restaurant neighbor
 Chanel Skunk as Lil' Pedro's business partner
 Jefferson Opossum as Pioneer, Billy Bob and Suzy Ann's great-great grandfather

Cast and crew 
 Billy Bob Possum - Charlie Rose
 Kari Watson - Samantha Caras
 Joe Raccoon - Jeff W. Maddux
 Chase Isben - Christopher Huber {Seasons 1 and 2}
 Christian Buenaventura (Pilot)
 Rancid DuBois - Marquise Wilson 〔Currently〕
 Todd Bender - Seth Adkins
 Big Al Gator - Joe "Mudfish" Hitch
 Ima Dilla Armadillo - Dianne Goldsboro
 Sam Watson - Tom Bosley
 Ethel Watson - Marion Ross
 Gumbo Fiddler Crab - puppeteer Daniel. W. Peeler
 Bobby Q. - puppeteer Paul Taylor
 Mya Raccoon - Cree Summers
 Frank Possum - Pep Harris
 Granny Muskrat - puppeteer Russi Taylor
 Melvis Weasley - Jeff Bennett
 Michelle Possum - Casey Carlson
 Suzy Ann Possum - Michelle Muller
 Slim Pig - Jack Reilly
 Phinneas Phatrat - Dan Povenmire
 Ribbit E. Lee - Jim Demetrius
 Freada Dyle - Faith Prince
 Mason Watson and All characters (voices) – Bobby Goldsboro
 Suzy Ann Possum (voice) - Pamelyn Ferdin {Episodes 13 and 14}
 Rue Phillips {Season 2}
 Christine Westmoreland {Currently}
Frank Possum (voice) - Mike Henry
Michelle Possum (voice) - Chantal Strand
Freada Dyle (voice) - Kath Soucie
Mya Raccoon (voice) - Tress MacNeille

Development 
Goldsboro funded the show using his own money instead of getting investors to back it.  According to him, "the minute somebody puts in money, they think they have the right to say, 'You know, Barney is so successful, why don't you make that alligator purple instead of green?' I've got enough to worry about without having to appease somebody else."  Goldsboro also decided to start the show on a PBS affiliate rather than on a network affiliate.  According to him, if he had gone to a network he "would have had to have a lot more action on the show. On the network shows, everything is fast cuts and fast movements. They think that's what kids want to see in this day and age of video games". Swamp Critter actor Charlie Rose (Billy Bob Possum and puppeteer), says "The pilot episode was produced in December 1995 at WEDU. Our company, Peeler-Productions, had spent the early part of that year designing and building the character costumes, heads, puppets, providing set designs to actor Jim Demetrius (Ribbet E. Lee) who doubled as set builder for another company." The rest of season 1 was produced in early 1996 and was broadcast the following spring. The same is true for the second season. In fall of 1996, the second season was in production, and made its first broadcast in the spring of 1997. Between 1998 and 1999, the first two seasons aired in reruns on PBS and The Learning ChannelTLC, and in the year 2000, the show was revived for a third season, which was broadcast between fall of 2000 and spring of 2001.

Music 
Each half-hour episode contains four to six songs, ranging from blues and Dixieland jazz to pop and classical and country music. For the first two seasons, over 100 songs were written. According to Goldsboro, "it's music that's on a children's show but it's not children's music. I've never understood talking down to kids and treating them like they're imbeciles. Several shows do that."

Animatronics 
Each of the main characters' costume heads contains over $20,000 worth of animatronics, which are used to control their facial expressions and mouth movements.

References

External links 
 

1995 American television series debuts
1995 American television series endings
1990s American children's television series
1990s American music television series
American children's education television series
American children's musical television series
American television shows featuring puppetry
Christian children's television series
English-language television shows
PBS Kids shows
PBS original programming
Television series about frogs
Television series about raccoons
Television series about reptiles and amphibians